Skip Marley Minto (born 4 June 1996) is a Jamaican singer. He is the son of Cedella Marley and David Minto, and grandson of Bob Marley. He has received two Grammy Award nominations and an MTV Video Music Award nomination.

Life and career 
Marley was born in Kingston, Jamaica, to Cedella Marley and David Minto, and raised in Miami, Florida. He shares his birthday with his uncle Julian Marley. Growing up, he taught himself to play the piano, drums, guitar, and bass.

In 2015, he released his first single, "Cry to Me", and a second single called "Life" under the Tuff Gong label. He later signed with Blue Mountain Music, and joined his uncles Damian and Stephen on their Catch a Fire tour.

In early 2016, he was featured in a Gap 1969 Denim campaign.

In early 2017, Marley signed to Island Records. Marley released his debut single under Island Records, "Lions", in February 2017, which was produced by Ilya Salmanzadeh. "Lions" was later used in the infamous Pepsi short film commercial, Live for Now. He is featured on, and co-wrote, Katy Perry's 2017 single "Chained to the Rhythm". The two performed the song at the 59th Annual Grammy Awards on 12 February 2017 and also at the 2017 Brit Awards on 22 February. They also performed at the 2017 iHeartRadio Music Awards on 5 March. Marley released the single "Calm Down" on 28 April 2017. In 2020, Marley was joined by students of the School of Rock to cover Bob Marley's "Three Little Birds", during the COVID-19 pandemic.
On 28 August, Marley released his debut extended play (EP), Higher Place. It includes the previously released singles, "Slow Down", "No Love", and "Make Me Feel", featuring Rick Ross and Ari Lennox.

Discography

EPs

Singles

As lead artist

As featured artist

Awards and nominations
Grammy Awards

|-
|rowspan=2|2021
|"Slow Down" (with H.E.R.)
|Best R&B Song
|
|-
|Higher Place
|Best Reggae Album
|
|-
|}
NAACP Image Awards

|-
|2021
|Skip Marley
|Outstanding New Artist
|
|-
|}
Soul Train Music Awards

|-
|rowspan=2|2020
|"Slow Down" (with H.E.R.)
|Best Collaboration
|
|-
|"Slow Down" (with H.E.R.)
|Video of The Year
|
|-
|}
BMI Awards

|-
|2018
|"Chained to the Rhythm" (with Katy Perry)
|Award-winning songs 
|
|-
|}
MTV Video Music Awards

|-
|2017
|"Chained to the Rhythm" (with Katy Perry)
|Best Pop Video
|
|-
|}

Notes

References

External links 
 
 

1996 births
Living people
Island Records artists
Jamaican male singers
Jamaican reggae musicians
Jamaican reggae singers
Marley family
Musicians from Kingston, Jamaica